Millionærdrengen is a 1936 Danish family film directed by A. W. Sandberg starring Karen Caspersen.

Cast
Karen Caspersen as Tante Fanny Rowly
Sigurd Langberg as Formynder Mickens
Peter Malberg as Major Plummer
Tove Arni as Dolly Plummer
Ebbe Rode as Ralph
Karen Lykkehus as Bess
Finn Mannu as John Rowly
Mathilde Nielsen
Ellen Rovsing
Astrid Neumann
Petrine Sonne as Pantelåner
Charles Wilken
William Bewer
Eigil Reimers
Aage Hertel 
Poul Müller as Mand John overnatter hos
Poul Reichhardt as Mand på plakat
Henry Nielsen as Fuld sømand
Ole Bruun as Den artige dreng
Morten Kiel as Avisdrengen

External links

1936 films
1930s Danish-language films
Danish black-and-white films
Films directed by A. W. Sandberg